Natrona may refer to the following in the United States and Egypt:

In Pennsylvania:

 Natrona, Pennsylvania
 Natrona High School
 Natrona Bottling Company, soda pop works in the above
 Natrona Heights, Pennsylvania
 Harrison Township, Allegheny County, Pennsylvania, the municipality encompassing the above

In Illinois:

 Natrona, Illinois

In Kansas:

 Natrona, Kansas

In Wyoming:

 Natrona, Wyoming
 Natrona County, Wyoming
 National Register of Historic Places listings in Natrona County, Wyoming
 Natrona County School District Number 1
 Natrona County High School, in the above district
 Casper–Natrona County International Airport

In Egypt:

 Wadi El Natrun (meaning "Natron Valley" and formerly known as Scetis or Scetes), a valley located in Beheira Governorate – including a town with the same name

Navy ship:

 USS Natrona (APA-214), an attack transport ship of the U.S. Navy in service during World War II

See also 
 
 Natron – The places above are named after these deposits.
 Sodium's chemical symbol is Na.
 Trona – The places above are named after these deposits.